Charles Monselet (30 April 1825, Nantes - 19 May 1888, Paris) was a French journalist, novelist, poet and playwright, nicknamed "the king of the gastronomes" by his contemporaries. He specialised in comedic and romantic novels and his total output was around 40 volumes.

Born at No. 16 rue Jean-Jacques-Rousseau in Nantes, a plaque bears witness to this on the facade, he lived in this city for the first nine years of his life, before his parents moved to Bordeaux. After growing up in Bordeaux, he returned to his hometown in 1852, before his literary career took place in Paris1.

The death of his friend Baron Brisse, during a dinner, earned him this joke - probably apocryphal: "Let's go to the table all the same!" He never liked overcooked fricots2. "

Literary snapshots, playful short stories, romance novels and detective stories, her bibliography includes around forty volumes full of color, gaiety and naturalness, in which women often play a central role, notably in La Franc-Maçonnerie des femmes (1856). A thick detective story set against a backdrop of sentimental intrigue. In the Paris of 1843, the young and ambitious Philippe Beyle falls in love with the beautiful singer Marianna, conquers her heart and then, having satisfied his vanity, abandons her. Humiliated, the singer uses her power within a female Freemasonry, a kind of parallel police headed by and for women, to launch the all-powerful secret society in the footsteps of her lover in order to satisfy his revenge.

His poem Les Petites Blanchisseuses enjoyed great notoriety in the 19th century. It is very often mentioned by Parisian journalists in their articles about laundresses at the time of their feast: Mi-Carême. Of this libertine poem, they only quote the first quatrain3, very correct, which does not suggest the rest:

The little laundresses
That we see, every Monday,
To lazy practices
Wear the laundry at noon,

He is one of the authors of the pastiche, Le Parnassiculet contemporain4, and was a friend of Jean-Gabriel Capot de Feuillide, to whom he devoted a favorable review in La Lorgnette littéraire. Dictionary of large and small authors of my time 5. A particularly striking minute portrait of Charles Baudelaire adorns, among others, this amusing gallery of portraits. Editor-in-chief and founder of Le Gourmet newspaper.

Eugène Chavette, wanting to prove that Monselet was not a gourmet, invited him one day in the company of Aurélien Scholl to the restaurant Brébant, and made him serve a meal where the dishes did not correspond to the printed menu: Les nests d 'swallows were in fact simple noodles with mashed flageolet beans, cod bream cooked on a comb, heather cock, a small turkey with absinthe, Château-Larose, Mâcon with a few drops of Grassot punch, etc. Monselet found the dishes and wines to be exquisite. 

The same year, he commits the Forgotten and the Dédaignés, picturesque rehabilitation of little-known authors of the eighteenth century, and, by comparison, points to the eclecticism of the stylistic schools of the middle of the Second Empire.

He is buried in the Père-Lachaise cemetery (66th division).

Prose (incomplete) 

 Les Chemises rouges, 5 vol., 1850-1857) — réédité en 3 volumes ayant pour titre 
 M. Le Duc s'amuse, lire en ligne [archive] sur Gallica ; 
 François Soleil, lire en ligne [archive] sur Gallica ; 
 La Fin de l'orgie, lire en ligne [archive] sur Gallica (1866).
 Statues et statuettes contemporaines, 1852.
 Histoire anecdotique du tribunal révolutionnaire (17 août-29 novembre 1792), 1853, lire en ligne [archive] sur Gallica.
 Rétif de la Bretonne. Sa vie et ses amours : documents inédits ; ses descendants ; catalogue complet de ses ouvrages, 1854, lire en ligne [archive] sur Gallica.
 Les Aveux d'un pamphlétaire, 1854.
 Figurines parisiennes, 1854, lire en ligne [archive] sur Gallica.
 Les Vignes du Seigneur, 1854.
 La Franc-Maçonnerie des femmes, 1856, 4 vol. — réédité aux éditions du Masque, coll. « Labyrinthes », no 190, 2011.
 Physionomies parisiennes. Acteurs et actrices, 1857.
 La Lorgnette littéraire. Dictionnaire de grands et des petits auteurs de mon temps, 1857, lire en ligne [archive] sur Gallica.
 Les Oubliés et les Dédaignés, 1857, lire en ligne [archive] sur Gallica.
 Les Ruines de Paris, 1857, vol., 1 [archive] sur Gallica ; 2 [archive] sur Gallica 3 [archive] sur Gallica 4 [archive] sur Gallica — réédité sous le titre L'Argent maudit, 1875.
 Monsieur de Cupidon, 1858, lire en ligne [archive] sur Gallica.
 La Cuisinière poétique, avec d'autres auteurs (1859)
 Les Tréteaux, 1859, lire en ligne [archive] sur Gallica.
 Théâtre du Figaro, 1861, lire en ligne [archive] sur Gallica.
 Les Galanteries du xviiie siècle (réédité sous le titre Les Amours du temps passé, 1875), 1862, lire en ligne [archive] sur Gallica.
 Almanach des gourmands, 1862-1870, 6 vol.
 Fréron, ou l'Illustre critique, sa vie, ses écrits, sa correspondance, sa famille, etc., 1864.
 De Montmartre à Séville, 1865, lire en ligne [archive] sur Gallica — réédité sous le titre Les Souliers de Sterne. Récits et tableaux de voyage : France, Angleterre, Italie, * * * Belgique, Allemagne, Espagne, Portugal, 1874, lire en ligne [archive] sur Gallica.
 Le Plaisir et l'Amour, 1865, lire en ligne [archive] sur Gallica.
 Les femmes qui font des scènes, 1865, lire en ligne [archive] sur Gallica.
 Almanach des rues et des bois, citadin, champêtre et poétique, pour 1866, indispensable à tous les gens de bien, 1866.
 Portraits après décès, avec lettres inédites, 1866, lire en ligne [archive] sur Gallica — réédité sous le titre Les Ressuscités, 1876.
 Les Premières Représentations célèbres, 1867, lire en ligne [archive] sur Gallica.
 Les Créanciers, 1870.
 Le Musée secret de Paris, v. 1870, lire en ligne [archive] sur Gallica.
 Chanvallon, histoire d'un souffleur de la Comédie-française, 1872, lire en ligne [archive] sur Gallica.
 Les Frères Chantemesse, 1872, 2 vol., 1 [archive] sur Gallica.
 Les Marges du Code. La Belle Olympe, 1873, lire en ligne [archive] sur Gallica.
 Les Mystères du Boulevard des Invalides, 1873, lire en ligne [archive] sur Gallica.
 Panier fleuri, prose et vers, 1873, lire en ligne [archive] sur Gallica.
 Gastronomie, récits de table, 1874.
 Les Années de gaieté, nouvelles (1875.
 Scènes de la vie cruelle, 1876, lire en ligne [archive] sur Gallica.
 Lettres gourmandes, manuel de l'homme à table, 1877.
 Une troupe de comédiens, 1879, lire en ligne [archive] sur Gallica.
 Le Petit Paris, tableaux et figures de ce temps, 1879, lire en ligne [archive] sur Gallica.
 Les Poésies complètes de Charles Monselet, 1880.
 Mon dernier-né, gaietés parisiennes, 1883.
 Encore un !, 1885, lire en ligne [archive] sur Gallica.
 Petits mémoires littéraires, 1885, lire en ligne [archive] sur Gallica.
 Jean de La Réole, roman (1888, lire en ligne [archive] sur Gallica.
 De A à Z, portraits contemporains, 1888, lire en ligne [archive] sur Gallica.
 Mes souvenirs littéraires, 1888.
 Promenades d'un homme de lettres. Nord, ouest, est, sud, 1889, lire en ligne [archive] sur Gallica.
 Sous le manteau : nouvelles, 1889, [archive] sur Gallica — réédité sous le titre Petits péchés, 1893.
 Curiosités littéraires et bibliographiques, 1890.
 Fantaisies, 1895,  lire en ligne [archive] sur Gallica.

References 
 Kilien Stengel. Anthologie des Poètes de la bonne chère, ed.Table Ronde (groupe Gallimard), 2007.

Writers from Nantes
1825 births
1888 deaths
19th-century French dramatists and playwrights
19th-century French poets
Burials at Père Lachaise Cemetery
19th-century French journalists
French male journalists
19th-century French novelists
French male poets
19th-century French male writers